John Oskar Emanuel "Long-John" Nilsson (27 April 1908 – 1 December 1987) was a Swedish footballer who played as a forward. He was the 1930–31 Allsvenskan top scorer while at GAIS and won two caps for the Sweden national team, scoring six goals.

Club career 
Beginning his career at IK Virgo, he had his breakthrough year in 1930 with GAIS when he became the 1930–31 Allsvenskan top scorer and helped the club win the 1930–31 Swedish Championship. He briefly played for IFK Östersund in 1934 before signing with AIK, where he spent two Allsvenskan seasons. He finished up his career at his hometown GAIS as well as at Sibbhults IF. He scored a total of 68 goals in 78 games for GAIS during his two spells with the club.

International career 
Nilsson made his debut for the Sweden national team on 17 July 1932, scoring two goals in a 3–4 loss to Austria at the Stockholm Olympic Stadium. He scored four goals in his second and ultimately last international appearance in a friendly game against Lithuania.

Career statistics

International 

Scores and results list Sweden's goal tally first, score column indicates score after each Nilsson goal.

Honours 
GAIS
 Allsvenskan: 1930–31

Individual
 Allsvenskan top scorer: 1930–31

References 

1908 births
1987 deaths
Swedish footballers
Association football forwards
Sweden international footballers
GAIS players
AIK Fotboll players
IFK Östersund players
Footballers from Gothenburg